The 2009-2010 season was the 14th edition of the Lebanese Basketball League. The regular season began on Friday, December 11, 2009 and ended on Thursday April 15, 2010. The playoffs began on Monday, April 19 and ended with the 2010 Finals on Thursday April 29, 2010, after Riyadi Beirut defeated Champville SC in 3 games to win their seventh title (new format).

Regular season

Standings

Stage 2

Playoffs

Brackets

Statistics Leaders

Awards 
 Player of the Year: Chester Jarell Giles, Riyadi Beirut
 Guard of the Year: Ali Mahmoud, Riyadi Beirut
 Forward of the Year: William Byrd, Hoops Club
 Center of the Year: Chester Jarell Giles, Riyadi Beirut
 Newcomer of the Year: Amir Saoud, Hoops Club
 Import of the Year: Chester Jarell Giles, Riyadi Beirut
 Domestic Player of the Year: Fadi El Khatib, Champville SC
 Defensive Player of the Year: Ghaleb Rida, Champville SC
 First Team:
 G: Ali Mahmoud, Riyadi Beirut
 F: Elie Rustom, Mouttahed Tripoli
 F: Fadi El Khatib, Champville SC
 F: William Byrd, Hoops Club
 F/C: Chester Jarell Giles, Riyadi Beirut
 Second Team:
 G: Enrique Clemons, Hoops Club
 G: Ghaleb Rida, Champville SC
 G: Omar El Turk, Riyadi Beirut
 F/C: Bassem Balaa, Mouttahed Tripoli
 C: Joe Vogel, Riyadi Beirut

Lebanese Basketball Cup 
Champville SC defeated Sagesse Beirut in the finals of the Lebanese Basketball Cup

References 
 http://www.asia-basket.com/Lebanon/basketball-League-Pepsi-LBL_2009-2010.asp

Lebanese Basketball League seasons
League
Lebanese